Changu Narayan is an ancient Hindu temple, located on a high hilltop that is also known as Changu or Dolagiri in Changunarayan Municipality of Bhaktapur District, Nepal. This hill is about 7 miles (or 12km) east of Kathmandu and a few miles north of Bhaktapur. The Manohara River flows beside the hill. The temple is considered to be one of the oldest temple in Nepal. The temple is dedicated to lord Vishnu and is held in special reverence by the Hindu people. 

The temple was surrounded by champak tree forest and a small village known as Changu. A Kashmiri king is said to have given his daughter, Champak, in marriage to the prince of Bhaktapur. The temple is considered to be named after her.

The Legend of Changu Narayan 
In ancient times a Gwala or cow herder, had brought a cow from a Brahmin named Sudarshan. The cow was known for producing large quantities of milk. The cow herder used to take the cow to Changu for grazing. At that time Changu was a forest of Champak trees. While grazing, the cow always went to the shade of a particular tree and a boy used to come there and drink the cow's milk. In the evening, when the cow herder took the cow home and started milking her, he got only a very small amount of milk. This continued for several days. He grew very sad, so he called on the Brahmin saying the cow was not giving enough milk. After observing this with his own eyes, Sudarshan agreed with the cow herder. The next day they  observed the cow's daytime activity while she was grazing in the forest. 

Brahmin and cow herder both hid behind the tree. To their surprise, a small black boy came out of the tree and started drinking the cow milk. The two men were furious because they thought the boy must be the devil and tree must be its home. So the Brahmin cut down the champak tree. When he was cutting it down, fresh human blood came out of the tree. Both Brahmin and cow herder got worried, believing they had committed a great crime and began to cry. Lord Vishnu emerged from the tree and told the Brahmin and Cowherd it was not their fault. Vishnu told the story of how he had committed a heinous crime by unwittingly killing Sudarshan's father while hunting in the forest. After that, cursed for the crime, he wandered the earth on his mount, ‘Garuda’, eventually descending on the hill at Changu. There he lived in anonymity, surviving on milk stolen from a cow. When Brahmin cut down the tree, Vishnu was beheaded, which freed Lord Vishnu from his sins. After hearing these words from Vishnu, Brahmin and cow herder resolved to worship the place and established a small temple in the name of Lord Vishnu. Ever since the site has been sacred. Even today,we find Sudarshan's descendant as a priest of the temple and the cow herder's descendants as Ghutiyars (conservators).

Physical Aspects
Changu Narayan Temple is placed at the top of hills surrounded by a forest of Champak trees. People from the Brahman, Chhetri, Tamang, Newar and other community live in and around Changu Narayan area. With the development of tourism in this place, we can find many medium and small sized hotels, restaurants, souvenir shops, etc. An ancient stone tap is located on the way to Changunaran which is believed to have existed since the time of Lichhavi.

The Temple art and architecture
Changu Narayan is considered to be the oldest temple of Nepal. It remains a milestone in Nepali temple architecture with rich embossed works. The two-storey roofed temple stands on a high plinth of stone. According to Professor Madhan Rimal, Department of Sociology and Anthropology, Tribhuvan university the temple is neither in Shikhara style nor the pagoda style. It has an architectural style which he would like to describe as a traditional Nepali temple. Many similar features are found at Gokarna Mahadev. The temple is surrounded by sculptures and arts related to Lord Vishnu. Also, we can find the temples of Lord Shiva, Ashta Matrika, Chhinnamasta, Kileshwor and Krishna inside the courtyard of the main temple.
There are four entrances to the temple and these gates are guarded by life-size pairs of animals such as lions, sarabhas, griffins and elephants on each side of the entrances. The ten incarnations of Lord Vishnu and the other idols are carved in the struts, which support the roof. 

The entrance door is gilded with carvings of Naga (snakes). On the main entrance gate (i.e. western entrance gate), we can find the Chakra, Sankha, Kamal, and Khadga all at the top of a stone pillar. These stone pillars have an inscription in Sanskrit. This inscription is considered to be the oldest inscription of Nepal and the stone inscription pillar was erected by Licchavi (kingdom) King Manadeva in 464 AD.

The following monument is located while visiting the temple from the right side after entering from the main entrance (Eastern gate) to the courtyard

 Historical pillar erected by Mandeva in 464 AD
 Garuda: flying vehicle of Lord Vishnu which has got a human face and is a devotee of Vishnu.
 Chanda Narayan (Garuda Narayan):- a 7th-century stone sculpture of Vishnu riding on Garuda. This sculpture has been depicted in the 10 rupee paper note issued by Nepal Rastra Bank
 Sridhar Vishnu:- 9th century stone sculpture of Vishnu, Laxmi, and Garuda which stands on the pedestals of various motifs.
 Vaikuntha VishnuA: 16th-century sculpture of Vishnu seated on the Lalitasan position on the six armed Garuda and Laxmi seated on the lap of Vishnu
 Chhinnamasta:- Temple dedicated to Chhinnamasta Devi, who beheaded herself, offered her own blood to feed the hungry Dakini and Varnini.
 Vishworup:- 7th century stone sculpture- beautifully carved that depicts the scene from the Bhagwat Gita, in which Lord Krishna manifests his universal form to his devotee Arjun.
 Vishnu Vikrant: 7th-century sculpture of Trivikram Vishnu that depicts the scene of popular Hindu myth of Lord Vishnu and his beloved Bali Raja.
 Narasimha: a 7th-century sculpture of Narasimha, an incarnation of Lord Vishnu, killing the demon King Hiranyakasyapa to save his beloved devotee Prahalad.
 Kileshwor: small two-storied temples of Lord Shiva, who is believed to have appeared in this place for the protection of the hill.

The main image in the sanctum is worshiped by Hindus as a Garuda Narayan, and by Buddhists as a Hariharihari Vahan Lokeshwara. Only the priest is allowed to see the image.

Information Centre
There is an information centre at the entrance to Changu Village. They issue tickets to the tourists. The information centre has a public toilet for tourists. Also, there are drinking water facilities for the tourists. But the drinking water facilities have not been managed properly. Only direct tap water is available there. According to Binaya Raj Shrestha, owner of Chagu Museum and the member of temple management committee, on an average 150 foreigners visit Changu.

Changu Museum
A private museum is also located on the Changu Narayan on the way to the temple. According to the owner of the museum, it is the first private museum of Nepal and it has the collection of ancient coins, tools, arts, and architecture. There is an excellent collection of ancient, historical, artistic, religious, archaeological, cultural and other rare objects. The museum has a good collection of ancient tools used by the Newar family during the medieval period. It was established on the occasion of the millennium year 2000 AD with the permission of Changu Narayan VDC. The entrance fee for Nepalese is NRs. 100 and NRs. 300 is charged for a foreigner. On an average 30 to 50 visitors visit this museum in a day. Mostly foreigners and Nepali students visit this museum.

Ethnographic Museum
There is an ethnographic museum nearby the temple which incorporates both objects and photographs collected by Judith Conant Chase. 
Amatya Sattal was a rest house established by an Amatya family of Bhaktapur shifted to Patan for preparation of rituals and feasts for rights of passage and annual occasions. Living Traditions Museum was established here in 2011 under an agreement with the Department of Archaeology and Guthi Sansthan and openase lighting in the uppermost level. The museum is currently under reconstruction since the 2015 earthquake the occasion of family ritual etc.l conduct special puja at the templ. One of the festival of Changu is Nag Panchami and Hari Bodhani

Management Approaches
Changu Narayan Temple is on the list of world heritage sites. The valuable stone sculpture and ancient inscriptions have archeological, historical and cultural significance. Changu Narayan VDC has formed a committee called Changu Narayan Temple Management Committee which is the responsible body to work for protection, preservation, and management. Likewise the Department of Archeology and Palace Management Office, Bhaktapur has also provided assistance on the conservation and preservation of the temple. Many local youth clubs are involved in managing festivals, organizing awareness programs in and around the temple area.

Threats/ Challenges
The Manohara stream has long seen rampant mining of sand and stones. The local administration has failed to control the mining activities. Because of the mining activities, the temple area has become prone to landslides. Due to overgrazing in the nearby forest, the chances of soil erosion and landslide are very high.

Gallery

After 2015 earthquake photo gallery

See also
Sheshnarayan Temple
List of Hindu temples in Nepal

References
https://www.insidehimalayas.com/the-changu-narayan-temple-legends...
von Schroeder, Ulrich. 2019. Nepalese Stone Sculptures. Volume One: Hindu; Volume Two: Buddhist. (Visual Dharma Publications). . Contains SD card with 15,000 digital photographs of Nepalese sculptures and other subjects as public domain.

External links

Awarded Thangka Painting School in Changu Narayan Temple Village;

Hindu temples in Bagmati Province
Nepalese culture
Newa architecture
World Heritage Sites in Nepal
Cultural heritage of Nepal
5th-century establishments in Nepal
Buildings and structures in Bhaktapur District
Vishnu temples in Nepal